Chief Adviser or Chief Advisor may refer to:
 Chief Advisor of Bhutan is a head of the interim government of Bhutan, 2013, 2018.
 Chief Adviser of Bangladesh, was the title of the head of 5 caretaker governments of Bangladesh for periods 1996–2007.